Harvest Christian Fellowship is a Baptist Evangelical multi-site megachurch based in Riverside, California, affiliated with the Calvary Chapel Association and the Southern Baptist Convention.

History
Harvest Christian Fellowship was founded in 1973 by Greg Laurie, who has been the senior pastor since that time.

In 2009, it opened a new building, with a 5,000-seat auditorium, a gymnasium, and a High School.

In 2017, while remaining a member of the Calvary Chapel Association, the church became a member of the Southern Baptist Convention, after a request from Laurie, because of the important programs of national and international evangelization of the latter.

According to a church census released in 2022, it claimed a weekly attendance of 14,560 people  and 4 campuses in different cities.

Harvest Crusades
In 1990, Greg Laurie started holding his first public evangelistic event which would soon be called the Harvest Crusades.

SWAT Team
The SWAT Team roams local streets inviting people to the event and sharing their faith.

References

External links
Harvest Christian Fellowship - Main site.
Greg Laurie's Personal Web Page
Harvest Crusade Page
Harvest Jr. High Site - Harvest Jr. High Ministry Site
Harvest's Sister Church - Harvest Christian Fellowship New York
Church of the Week - CBN.com

Evangelical megachurches in the United States
Megachurches in California
Baptist churches in California
Religion in Riverside County, California
Christian organizations established in 1979
Christian denominations established in the 20th century